Menegazzia lucens is a species of foliose lichen from New Zealand.

See also
List of Menegazzia species

References

lucens
Lichen species
Lichens described in 1983
Lichens of New Zealand
Taxa named by Peter Wilfred James
Taxa named by David Galloway (botanist)